This is a list of mayors of Cape Breton Regional Municipality, Nova Scotia, Canada. The region's first mayor John Coady was elected in 1995 when the region was created by the province through amalgamation of the previous municipal units.

List

References

Cape Breton